This is the results breakdown of the local elections held in Catalonia on 22 May 2011. The following tables show detailed results in the autonomous community's most populous municipalities, sorted alphabetically.

Overall

City control
The following table lists party control in the most populous municipalities, including provincial capitals (shown in bold). Gains for a party are displayed with the cell's background shaded in that party's colour.

Municipalities

Badalona
Population: 218,886

Barcelona

Population: 1,619,337

Cornellà de Llobregat
Population: 87,240

Girona
Population: 96,236

L'Hospitalet de Llobregat
Population: 258,642

Lleida
Population: 137,387

Mataró
Population: 122,905

Reus
Population: 106,622

Sabadell
Population: 207,338

Sant Cugat del Vallès
Population: 81,745

Santa Coloma de Gramenet
Population: 120,060

Tarragona
Population: 134,933

Terrassa
Population: 212,724

References

Catalonia
2011